Blood and Guts in High School is a novel by Kathy Acker. It was written in the late 1970s and copyrighted in 1978. It traveled a convoluted route to publication, before being officially released in 1984. It remains Acker's most popular and best-selling book. The novel is a metafictional text, aware of its status as a fictional piece.

Plot and narrative
Blood and Guts in High School, while having a frequently disrupted and heavily surreal narrative, is the story of Janey Smith, a ten-year-old American girl living in Mérida, Mexico, who departs to the US to live on her own. She has an incestuous sexual relationship with her father, whom she treats as "boyfriend, brother, sister, money, amusement, and father." They live together in Mexico until another woman begins to interest Janey's father, leading Janey to realize he hates her because she limits him by dominating his life, and he wants to have his own life. Her father agrees to let her go and puts her into a school in New York City. For a period of time her father sends her money, but later she begins to work at a hippie bakery and is appalled by the customers, whose behavior gradually spirals out of control. She has many sexual partners. She ends up pregnant twice and has two abortions; she seems to be furiously addicted to sex and does not care whom she sleeps with. In New York City she joins a gang, the Scorpions. One day, while the gang is driving frantically in a stolen car from the police, they are involved in a car crash: Janey is the only one who survives. Afterwards, she begins to live in the New York slums. Two thieves break into her apartment, kidnap her, and sell her into prostitution. She becomes the property of a Persian slave trader who keeps her locked up, trying to turn her out as a prostitute. We see Janey's dreams and visions, and read her journal entries and poems as the lines between reality and fiction begin to become blurred.

Shortly before the kidnapper is to release her to become a prostitute for him, she discovers she has cancer. The slave trader lets her go and she illegally goes to Tangier, Morocco. There she meets Jean Genet, the iconic French writer, and they develop a relationship while Janey vulgarly and intensely discusses but later becomes attracted to President Jimmy Carter. Janey and Genet travel through North Africa and stop in Alexandria. Genet treats Janey badly and thinks little of her, but the worse he treats her the more she loves him. He decides to leave her. Janey gets arrested for stealing Genet's property, and shortly afterwards, by her luck, he joins her in prison. A rebellion breaks out as the narrative continues to deteriorate while particular figures, collectively named the Capitalists, meet to discuss how their society is collapsing. As it peaks, Janey and Genet are both thrown out of Alexandria. After travelling together across North Africa for some time, Genet gives Janey some money and leaves. However, soon after they part company, Janey dies suddenly, leaving time to pass endlessly as the narrative breaks into a final set of dream maps; here, the novel concludes.

Storytelling technique
In Blood and Guts in High School, Acker uses the technique of collage. She inserts letters, poems, drama scenes, dream visions and drawings. Acker also freely admitted to using plagiarism in her work.

Blood and Guts in High School incorporates the text from one of Acker's previous works, "Hello, I'm Erica Jong", a chapbook written passive-aggressively and vulgarly towards novelist and feminist satirist Erica Jong.

Like the novel's heroine, Janey, Acker also died of breast cancer, twenty years after writing Blood and Guts.  Many of Acker's heroines have or fear getting cancer.

Reception and legacy
This book is featured in Peter Boxall's book 1001 Books You Must Read Before You Die.

Adaptations
Laura Parnes created a "re-imagining" of the novel as a multi-screen video art piece in 2007.

References

Further reading
Hawkins, Susan E. “All in the Family: Kathy Acker’s Blood and Guts in High School.” Contemporary Literature 45.4 (2004) : 637–658. Print. 
Hughes, Kathy. “Incest and Innocence: Janey’s Youth in Kathy Acker’s Blood and Guts in High School.” Nebula 3.1 (2006) : Print.
Muth, Katie R. “Postmodern Fiction as Poststructuralist Theory: Kathy Acker’s Blood and Guts in High School.” Narrative 19.1 (2011) : 87-111. Print.

1984 American novels
Metafictional novels
Postmodern novels
Jean Genet
Fiction with unreliable narrators
Novels set in Mexico
Novels set in New York City
Novels set in Morocco
Novels set in Egypt
Novels about American prostitution
Novels about child sexual abuse
Obscenity controversies in literature
Nonlinear narrative novels
Experimental literature